A drug house (also known as a drug den, crack house, shooting gallery, or trap house) is a residence used in the illegal drug trade. Drug houses shelter drug users and provide a place for drug dealers to supply them. Drug houses can also be used as laboratories to synthesize (cook) drugs, or cache ingredients and product.

Drug houses have been a subject widely presented in hip hop and trap music, with the latter genre being named after an American slang term for a drug houses.

United States 
The strongest industry in some urban areas is the illegal drug trade. Abandoned buildings ravaged by arson or neglect are utilized by drug dealers since they are free, obscure, secluded and there is no paper trail in the form of rent receipts. The sale of illegal drugs often draws violent crime to afflicted neighborhoods, sometimes exacerbating the exodus of residents. In some cases, enraged citizens have burned crack houses to the ground, in hopes that by destroying the sites for drug operations they would also drive the illegal industries from their neighborhoods. Many major American urban areas contain crack houses.

United Kingdom 

Strong legislation in England and Wales provides a mechanism for police and local authorities to close premises which have been associated with disorder or serious nuisance. Often, these drug houses have been found in social housing, which has been taken over by drug dealers and users.

These closure orders were designed to disrupt class A drug dealing and anecdotal evidence suggests that it mainly affects socially housed tenants. The effect is that once an order is made, the premises are boarded up, and no one may enter the premises, initially for a period of three months, but this can be extended to six months on the application of the police.

Popular culture 
 Crack House
 Spike Lee's film Jungle Fever (the Taj Mahal sequence)

See also 
 Clandestine chemistry
 Opium den
 Rolling meth lab

References 

House types
Illegal drug trade
Urban decay